Accumulator 1 is a 1994 film directed by Jan Svěrák. The film won the Grand Prize at the 7th Yubari International Fantastic Film Festival in February 1996. It won the audience award at the Tromsø International Film Festival in 1996.

Plot
Young surveyor Olda (Petr Forman) is courting a girl, Jitka (Tereza Pergnerová), but his colleague Slezák (Bolek Polívka) coaxes her into bed at his home. The morally exhausted Olda does not stop them, and watches TV all night, where he appeared that day in an absurd interview. He loses consciousness for three days and ends up in a hospital room with the ageing Mikulík (Jiří Kodet). That night, mysterious healer Fišarek (Zdeněk Svěrák) appears to help them, returning lost energy to Olda. Fišarek shows him how to take energy from trees, works of art and natural phenomena. When Mikulik dies, they examine his body and realize that he died watching TV, having lost all his energy. They meet his daughter Anna (Edita Brychta).

Fišarek continues healing experiments on Olda with a company of mediums. On TV, they see an old teacher. The action moves into the television universe, inhabited by doppelgangers of people who have previously been on TV, who live a hedonistic party lifestyle, shamelessly feeding on energy from their real counterparts.

Olda finds Anna in a phone book and takes her on a date. In a cafe, drunken Slezak comes up to them, wanting to take Anna away as well, but she rejects him. Arriving at Anna's house, the couple confess their feelings for each other and go to the bedroom to make love. However, Olda accidentally turns on the TV, which again steals his energy. When he arrives to tell Fišarek, he meets the teacher from the TV show, who has experienced the same thing and reached the same conclusion. The teacher flees to a remote village without a television, while Olda stays in Prague to be close to Anna. Even in the middle of nowhere, the teacher sees a TV, and again turns to Fišarek for help.

Olda proposes marriage to Anna, but she reveals that she has a daughter. She tells him to meet her at the opera the next day. In the meantime, he buys some remote controls as protection against TV sets. Jitka visits him, complaining about Slezak and asking for forgiveness, but he rejects her and goes to meet Anna at the opera to see Nabucco. He absorbs energy from the art and goes into the street several times to store it in a batch of boards. After the opera, they drive back to Anna's. During a power cut, Olda reads Anna's daughter a fairy tale about a prince who defeated a witch by flooding her with life force from several people. He formulates a similar plan to destroy the television "mirror world", by oversaturating a TV set with energy from the charged boards.

Meanwhile, the television alter-ego is symbolically buried by media personalities, being lowered off the ship into a landfill. "Dead" media personalities can still lie down and talk, but no longer have energy. He decides to escape this hopeless surreal world.

The next day, Olda gathers as much energy as possible from people in the city, and at night attempts to carry out his plan. He is interrupted by Slezak, who is looking for Jitka, and tries to start a fight, but is too drunk. Olda detonates the supply of boards in his apartment and sends the released energy across the bridge. It flows towards the television, but at the last moment Olda abandons his plan, realizing that he is standing in the path of the energy stolen from people. He releases the energy, which would otherwise destroy him, and the energy saves a falling plane instead. As the dust settles, Olda's tele-ego appears and they embrace and merge together. Slezak, who broke into Olda's apartment before the explosion, is arrested. The next morning, Olda calls Anna to apologize for the missed date and it is assumed that their relationship will continue normally. Television is no longer dangerous for him, but the global problem stays unsolved.

Cast
Petr Forman as Olda Soukup
Edita Brychta as Anna
Zdeněk Svěrák as Fišarek: a natural healer
Marián Labuda as The Teacher
Bolek Polívka as Slezák
Tereza Pergnerová as Jitka
Jiří Kodet as Mikulík
Marketa Frosslová as Anička
Ladislav Smoljak as Caretaker
Daniela Kolářova as Mrs. Fišarkova
Rudolf Hrušinský Jr. as Pitrýsek
David Koller as The Cowboy
Robert Kodym as The Indian
Nada Safratova as Gabriela
Ivo Kašpar as Pištek

References

External links

1994 films
1994 comedy films
1990s fantasy comedy films
1990s Czech-language films
1990s English-language films
Films directed by Jan Svěrák
Czech action films
Czech science fiction films
Czech comedy films
Czech fantasy films
Czech Lion Awards winners (films)
Films with screenplays by Zdeněk Svěrák
Films about television
1994 multilingual films
Czech multilingual films